Kymi may refer to:
Kymi, Greece, a town in Euboea, Greece
Kymi, Finland, a former municipality in Finland
Kymi (constituency), a constituency in the Finnish Parliament
Kymi (region), or Kymenlaakso, the region of Finland
Kymi B.C., a basketball club based in Kymi, Greece
Kymi Ring, a racing circuit in Finland
Kymi River, a river in Finland
Kymi Province, a province in Finland from 1947 to 1997
KYMI (FM), a radio station (97.5 FM) licensed to serve Charlo, Montana, United States
KJJT, a defunct radio station (98.5 FM) formerly licensed to serve Los Ybanez, Texas, United States, which held the call sign KYMI from 1990 to 2007

See also
Kyminlinna, a castle in Finland
Kyme (disambiguation)